The 2022 Great Lakes Intercollegiate Athletic Conference football season was the season of college football played by the seven member schools of the Great Lakes Intercollegiate Athletic Conference (GLIAC) as part of the 2022 NCAA Division II football season.

Grand Valley State compiled a perfect 11–0 regular-season record, won the GLIAC championship, and was ranked No. 3 in the final NCAA Division II poll. The team advanced to the NCAA Division II playoffs where they lost in the second round to Ferris State. Ferris State quarterback Cade Peterson won GLIAC Offensive Back of the Year honors.

Ferris State compiled a 10–1 record in the regular season, losing a close game to Grand Valley State, and were ranked No. 1 in the final NCAA Division II poll. However, the Bulldogs later defeated Grand Valley State when they met for a second time at the Super Regional Final stage of the NCAA Division II playoffs. Grand Valley State defensive back Caleb Murphy won GLIAC Player of the Year honors. Ferris went on to win the 2022 NCAA Division II Football Championship Game on December 17, 2022, with a 14–1 overall record.

Davenport compiled an 8–3 record and was the third GLIAC team to advance to the Division II playoffs, losing to Ferris State in the first round. Davenport head coach Sparky McEwen won GLIAC Coach of the Year honors.

Conference overview

All-GLIAC honors

Players of the year honors
On November 17, 2022, the conference coaches selected the following players for player of the year honors:

 Player of the Year - Caleb Murphy, defensive end, Ferris State
 Offensive Back of the Year - Cade Peterson, quarterback, Grand Valley State
 Offensive Lineman of the Year - Quinton Barrow, offensive tackle, Grand Valley State
 Defensive Lineman of the Year - Christian McCarroll, defensive end, Grand Valley State
 Defensive Back of the Year - Abe Swanson, linebacker, Grand Valley State
 Freshman of the Year - Carson Gulker, quarterback, Ferris State
 Coach of the Year - Sparky McEwen, Davenport

All-GLIAC teams
The coaches also named the following players as first-team players on the 2022 All-GLIAC football team:

Offense
 Quarterback - Cade Peterson, Grand Valley State
 Running backs - Tariq Reid, Grand Valley State; Tyshon King, Northern Michigan; Kendall Wiliams, Wayne State
 Halfback - CJ Jefferson, Ferris State
 Wide receivers - Jahdae Walker, Grand Valley State; Tyrese Hunt-Thompson, Ferris State; Sy Barnett, Davenport; Darius Willis, Michigan Tech
 Offensive linemen - Quinton Barrow, Grand Valley State; Adam Sieler, Ferris State; Hayden Huttula, Michigan Tecch; Jordan Davis, Grand Valley State; Garrett Carroll, Grand Valley State; Blake Bustard, Wayne State
 Place kicker - Brandon Gielow, Davenport

Defense
 Defensive linemen - Caleb Murphy, Ferris State; Christian McCarroll, Grand Valley State; Jordan Jones, Ferris State; Victor Nelson, Saginaw Valley State; Austin Alward, Davenport
 Linebackers - Abe Swanson, Grand Valley State; Trevor Nowaske, Saginaw Valley State; Marc Sippel, Michigan Tech; Konnor Near, Ferris State; Damon Wesley, Grand Valley State
 Defensive backs - Nick Whiteside, Saginaw Valley State; Sidney McCloud, Ferris State; Shaq Floyd, Davenport; Nyzier Fourqurean, Grand Valley State; Cyntell Williams, Ferris State
 SP - Marcus Taylor, Ferris State
 Punter - Trace Hrgich, Gand Valley State

Teams

Grand Valley State

The 2022 Grand Valley State Lakers football team represented Grand Valley State University as a member of the Great Lakes Intercollegiate Athletic Conference (GLIAC) during the 2022 NCAA Division II football season. In their 12th year under head coach Matt Mitchell, the Lakers compiled a 12–1 record (6–0 against conference opponents), won the GLIAC championship, and were ranked No. 1 nationally at the end of the regular season. The Lakers would defeat five ranked teams during the regular season, including a 25–22 victory over No. 4 Colorado Mines in the season opener and rivalry game victories over No. 1 Ferris State and No. 17 .

In the playoffs, the Lakers received a bye in the first round and won in the second round, before losing in the quarterfinals against rival Ferris State.

The team was led on offense by junior quarterback Cade Peterson. Peterson completed 159 of 273 passes for 2,439 yards with 16 touchdowns and four interceptions. Junior running back Tariq Reid was the team's leading rusher with 1,027 rushing yards and 19 touchdowns on 161 carries for an average of 6.4 yards per carry.

Schedule

Roster
 Anthony Cardamone, No. 48, linebacker, 6'0", 215 pounds, Macomb, Michigan
 Nyzier Fourqurean, No. 12, defensive back, 6'1", 185 pounds, Mentor, Ohio
 Jack Gilchrist, No. 92, defensive line, 6'2", 272 pounds, Mason, Michigan
 Trace Hrgich, No. 35, punter, redshirt freshman, 6'2", 163 pounds, Wheaton, Illinois
 Colton Hyble, No. 55, defensive end, junior, 6'5", 267 pounds, Mount Pleasant, Michigan
 Kollin Kralapp, No. 46, kicker, sophomore, 6'0", 180 pounds, Macomb, Michigan
 Christian McCarroll, No. 9, defensive line, 6'4", 260 pounds, Barberton, Ohio
 Damonte McCurdy, No. 32, defensive back, 5'9", 182 pounds, Birmingham, Michigan
 Luke McLean, No. 16, defensive back, 5'11", 183 pounds, Rockford, Michigan
 Avery Moore, No. 15, quarterback, sophomore, 6'2", 230 pounds, New Lothrop, Michigan
 Cade Peterson, No. 13, quarterback, junior, 6'4", 223 pounds, Maple City, Michigan
 Jack Provencher, No. 4, running back, senior, 5'11", 215 pounds, Shelby Township, Michigan
 Tariq Reid, No. 2, running back, junior, 6'0", 211 pounds, Davison, Michigan
 Terez Reid, No. 0, defensive back, redshirt freshman, 5'10", 175 pounds, Indianapolis
 Antonio Strong, No. 7, defensive back, 6'0", 199 pounds, Grand Rapids, Michigan
 Abe Swanson, No. 41, linebacker, 6'1", 222 pounds, St. Charles, Illinois
 Cody Tierney, No. 18 wide receiver, sophomore 5'10", 190 pounds, Grand Rapids, Michigan
 Jaylon Tillman, No. 8, wide receiver, sophomore, 6'0", 208 pounds, Plainfield, Illinois
 Jahdae Walker, No. 17, wide receiver, sophomore, 6'4", 185 pounds, Cleveland
 Damon Wesley, No. 1, linebacker, senior, 5'11", 225 pounds, Indianapolis

Ferris State

The 2022 Ferris State Bulldogs football team represented Ferris State University as a member of the Great Lakes Intercollegiate Athletic Conference (GLIAC) during the 2022 NCAA Division II football season. Led by 11th-year head coach Tony Annese, the Bulldogs compiled an overall record of 14–1 with a mark of 5–1 in conference play, placing second in the GLIAC. Ferris State received an at-large bid for the NCAA Division II Football Championship playoffs, beating Davenport in the first round,  in the second round, Grand Valley State in the quarterfinals, West Florida in the semifinals,  Colorado Mines in the NCAA Division II Championship Game to repeat as NCAA Division II champions. The team played home games at Top Taggart Field in Big Rapids, Michigan.

Schedule

Davenport

The 2022 Davenport Panthers football team represented Davenport University of Caledonia Township, Kent County, Michigan in the GLIAC during the 2022 NCAA Division II season. In their sixth year under head coach Sparky McEwen, the Panthers compiled an 8–3 record (4–2 against conference opponents), were ranked No. 21 in the final Division II poll, and finished third in the GLIAC. They advanced to the Division II playoffs where they lost to Ferris State in the first round.

Schedule

Saginaw Valley State

The 2022 Saginaw Valley State Cardinals football team represented Saginaw Valley State University in the GLIAC during the 2022 NCAA Division II season. Under head coach Ryan Brady, the Cardinals compiled an 8–3 record (3–3 against conference opponents) and finished fourth in the GLIAC.

Schedule

Michigan Tech

The 2022 Michigan Tech Huskies football team represented Michigan Tech University in the GLIAC during the 2022 NCAA Division II football season. Led by sixth-year head coach Steve Olson, the Huskies compiled a 4–7 record (2–4 in conference play), placing fifth in the GLIAC. Michigan Tech played home games at Kearly Stadium in Houghton, Michigan.

Schedule

Northern Michigan

The 2022 Northern Michigan Wildcats football team represented Northern Michigan University in the GLIAC during the 2022 NCAA Division II season. Under head coach Kyle Nystrom, the Wildcats compiled a 4–7 record (1–5 against conference opponents) and finished sixth in the GLIAC.

Schedule

Wayne State

The 2022 Wayne State Warriors football team represented Wayne State University in the GLIAC during the 2022 NCAA Division II season. The Warriors compiled a 1–9 record (0–6 against conference opponents) and finished last in the GLIAC.

Schedule

References

 
Great Lakes Intercollegiate Athletic Conference football